Esperidión Arsenio Manuel (1909 - 2003), known as E. Arsenio Manuel, was a Philippine academic, historian, and anthropologist best known for his contributions to Philippine anthropology, history, literature, and linguistics.  During a three-decade academic career at the University of the Philippines, he wrote a seminal survey of Philippine folk epics, and was responsible for discovering and publishing folk epics from the Manuvu, Matigsalug, and Ilianon peoples.

He is sometimes referred to as the "Dean of Filipino Anthropology" and "Father of Philippine Folklore."

Major awards 
Among the most significant honors awarded to E. Arsenio Manuel were the Cultural Center of the Philippines' Gawad Para sa Sining in 1989; and the National Commission for Culture and the Arts' Dangal Alab ng Haraya Award  for a lifetime achievement in cultural research, in 2000.

E. Arsenio Manuel was made a National social Scientist of the Philippines in 1991.

See also 
Isabelo de los Reyes
Damiana Eugenio
Gilda Cordero Fernando

References

1909 births
People from Nueva Ecija
20th-century Filipino historians
Filipino anthropologists
20th-century anthropologists
2003 deaths